St. Thomas Aquinas High School may refer to:

 Canada
 St. Thomas Aquinas Catholic High School (North Vancouver), British Columbia
 St. Thomas Aquinas Catholic High School (Russell, Ontario)
 St. Thomas Aquinas Catholic Secondary School (Lindsay), Ontario
 St. Thomas Aquinas Catholic Secondary School (London, Ontario)
 St. Thomas Aquinas Catholic Secondary School (Oakville), Ontario

 Ghana
 St. Thomas Aquinas Senior High School, Cantoments

 United Kingdom
 St. Thomas Aquinas High School (Edinburgh), Scotland

 United States
 St. Thomas Aquinas High School (Connecticut), New Britain, Connecticut
 St. Thomas Aquinas High School (Florida), Ft. Lauderdale, Florida
 St. Thomas Aquinas Catholic High School (Guam)
 St. Thomas Aquinas High School (Overland Park, Kansas)
 Saint Thomas Aquinas High School (Louisiana), Hammond, Louisiana
 St. Thomas Aquinas High School (New Hampshire), Dover, New Hampshire
 St. Thomas Aquinas High School (New Jersey), Edison, New Jersey
 St. Thomas Aquinas High School (Ohio), Louisville, Ohio

See also 

 Aquinas High School (disambiguation)
 St. Thomas Aquinas Secondary School (disambiguation)
 St. Thomas High School (disambiguation)
 St Thomas School (disambiguation)